Darnall is an electoral ward in City of Sheffield, England.

Darnall may also refer to:

People
Brig. Gen. Carl Rogers Darnall, MD, developer of chlorination of drinking water
Henry Darnall (1645–1711), Maryland planter
Philip Darnall (born 1604), English barrister

Places
South Africa
 Darnall, KwaZulu-Natal, a town in South Africa
United Kingdom
 Darnall (ward), a ward of Sheffield
United States
Darnall Hall (A Georgetown University first-year undergraduate residence hall in Washington, DC.)
 Darnall Place (Poolesville, Maryland), listed on the NRHP in Maryland
 Darnall's Chance (Upper Marlboro, Maryland), listed on the NRHP in Maryland
Darnall, San Diego, California (A neighborhood in the mid-city region of San Diego, California.)
Carl R. Darnall Army Medical Center (formerly Darnall Army Community Hospital), Fort Hood, Killeen, Texas